St Germans Priory is a large Norman church in the village of St Germans in south-east Cornwall, England, UK.

History
According to a credible tradition the church here was founded by St Germanus himself ca. 430 AD. The first written record however is of Conan being made Bishop in the Church of St Germans as a result of King Athelstan's settlement with Cornwall. The fixing of the see here shows that the Celtic monastery was already of great importance. Possession of two holdings of land in the parishes of Landrake ("Landerhtun") and Landulph ("Tinieltun" i.e. Tinnel) was confirmed by King Canute in 1018; they had been granted by King Edmund. Both holdings remained in the monastery's possession until 1538. In 1042 the see was moved to Crediton and the lands of the monastery were divided into two parts, one for the monastery and one (named Cuddenbeak) for the Bishop of Crediton. After the Norman Conquest a college of secular canons was established which is said to have been reconstituted in the time of Bishop Bartholomew (1161–1184) as a college of regular canons.

The present church replaces an Anglo-Saxon building which was the cathedral of the Bishops of Cornwall. The church is dedicated to St Germanus and soon after construction it became the cathedral for Cornwall in 926 AD, when King Athelstan appointed Conan as the bishop of Cornwall. The bishopric was to be short-lived, however, as it was transferred to Crediton in 1042 AD. A monastery grew alongside the church, and was reorganized by the Bishop of Exeter between 1161 and 1184 as an Augustinian priory. The priory church was rebuilt on a grand scale, with two western towers and a nave of 102 ft.
The church was once called the Cathedral of Cornwall because it is where the bishop of the duchy would be.

At the Dissolution of the Monasteries under King Henry VIII the priory was abolished and its buildings became a private house, home to the Eliot family, in whose hands the house remains. A number of the Eliot family are interred in the church.

St Germans parish was once the largest in Cornwall. St Germans Priory is now managed by the Church of England and the St Germans Priory Trust.

Architecture
Some of the original Norman features remain, including the large arched western doorway which is particularly ornate and is carved from elvan quarried at Landrake.

There is a mortuary chapel for the Moyle family of Bake.

At Dupath Well the wellhouse is said to have been built in 1510 by the monks of St Germans.

There is a peal of eight bells.

The church has a two manual pipe organ on the left side of the church. The church also has two towers.

Other burials
John Eliot, 1st Earl of St Germans
Henry Eliot, 5th Earl of St Germans
John Eliot (died 1685)
Edward James Eliot
John Eliot, 1st Earl of St Germans
Edward Craggs-Eliot, 1st Baron Eliot

See also

Bishop of St Germans
List of cathedrals in the United Kingdom
List of English abbeys, priories and friaries serving as parish churches

References

Further reading
Henderson, Charles (1929) Records of the Church and Priory of St. Germans in Cornwall. Shipston-on-Stour: “King’s Stone” Press

Anglo-Saxon cathedrals
St Germans
St Germans
St Germans
St Germans
English churches with Norman architecture
Burial sites of the Eliot family of St Germans